Bengt Åkerblom (2 May 1967 – 15 October 1995) was a Swedish professional ice hockey player.

Biography
Åkerblom played fifty-three games during three seasons for Djurgårdens IF Hockey in the Elitserien, in addition to seven seasons with Mora IK in the Allsvenskan.

Åkerblom is one of the few ice hockey players to have sustained a fatal injury on-ice whilst playing for their team. This happened during an exhibition game on 15 October 1995 between his team Mora IK and Brynäs IF at the FM Mattsson Arena in Mora, Sweden, when the 28-year-old Swede had his carotid arteries cut by a skate. A requirement for all ice hockey players to wear a neck guard was introduced in Sweden on 1 January 1996.

References

External links 

 https://web.archive.org/web/20090304122603/http://www.hockeysnack.com/permalink/594594 

1967 births
1995 deaths
Sport deaths in Sweden
Swedish ice hockey centres
Djurgårdens IF Hockey players
Mora IK players
Ice hockey players who died while playing